Citystate Savings Bank is a publicly listed thrift bank listed in the Philippine Stock Exchange. The bank was a partnership between a group of Filipino businessmen led by Ambassador Antonio Cabangon Chua and a Singaporean investment holding company. It was granted the thrift bank license by the Monetary Board of Bangko Sentral ng Pilipinas in 1997. City State offers banking services, such as deposit products and services, cash management, onsite/offsite ATM facilities, corporate and retail banking, and treasury services. The bank caters to the needs of corporate, middle market and retail clients. The bank operates a total of 24 branches nationwide and employs 276 employees at the end of 2009. As of December 27, 2010, Citystate has a total market capitalization of P2.03 billion and share price of P28.00.

History
Citystate Savings Bank started its banking operations a day after the Monetary Board of Bangko Sentral ng Pilipinas approved its thrift bank license on August 7, 1997. On January 2, 2002, the company went public and was formally listed in the Philippines Stock Exchange under the stock symbol CSB. 

To sustain its expansion in terms of setting up more branches complemented with the development of new products and enhanced services, the bank ventured into a stock rights offering of 22 million which increased its capitalization to P670 million to P450 million.

In November 2006, Citystate Bank obtained its Trust and Foreign Currency Deposit license from the Bangko Sentral ng Pilipinas to accept dollar and other foreign currency denominated deposits and manages funds, securities, and properties.

Products and services

For its credit and financing business, City State accepts jewelry for instant cash loan. It also offers other lending activities of servicing commercial loans, real estate and development loans, auto-financing, salary loan, agricultural loans, and others.

City State is also included in the list of Government Securities Eligible Dealers (GSEDs) and is allowed to participate in the electronic auction of government securities through the Automated Debt Auction Processing System (ADAPS).

The bank also operates foreign currency deposits and performs trust and fiduciary business.

Financial highlights

City State incurred a net loss of P3.713 million at the end of the third quarter of 2010. It was lower by P8.510 million from a year ago. Accumulated net loss after three quarters amounted to P8.24 million as compared to last year’s income of P6.33 million. This was a result of the required loan loss reserves as directed by BSP.

Total resources after three quarters netted a loss of P145 million from P2.50 billion to P2.36 billion. This was attributed to the decreases in loans and receivables, cash and, due from other banks, financial assets at Fair Value through profit or loss, and investment properties.

External links

City State Savings Bank 3RD quarter company report
City State Savings Bank official website

References

Banks of the Philippines
Companies listed on the Philippine Stock Exchange
Companies based in Pasig